Simon N. Powell (born February 1955) is a British cancer researcher and radiation oncologist residing in New York City.

Biography
Powell was born on February 13, 1955, in Manchester, England. Powell received the Bachelor of Medicine, Bachelor of Surgery in 1981 from the University of London and went on to complete his Ph.D. there in 1991, holding residencies at Whittington Hospital and Hammersmith Hospital in London and a fellowship at the Royal Marsden Hospital before being recruited and settling in America.

Career
Powell held a fellowship at Harvard Medical School in 1991, becoming an instructor in 1992, and associate professor of radiation oncology in 1998. He then became clinical director of the Gillette Center for Women's Cancers, co-leader of the Harvard Breast Cancer Research Program, and leader of the DNA Repair/Radiation Biology Program. From 2004 to 2008 he served as professor and head of Radiation therapy/radiation oncology at the Washington University School of Medicine in St. Louis.

In 2008, Powell moved to New York to join Memorial Sloan Kettering Cancer Center and become the Chair of the Department of Radiation Oncology in Memorial Hospital with a joint appointment in Sloan Kettering Institute's Molecular Biology Program. He was also appointed to the faculties of the Gerstner Sloan Kettering Graduate School of Biomedical Science and Weill Cornell Graduate School of Medical Sciences. He also holds the Enid A. Haupt Chair in Radiation Oncology at the Center. His career has centered on understanding DNA repair alterations in cancer and how they can be used for the basis of selective cancer therapies. His clinical expertise is in the treatment of breast cancer.

Memberships and significant positions 

 Fellow of the Royal College of Radiologists of the United Kingdom
 Associate editor, International Journal of Cancer for eight years
 Associate editor, Radiation Research for 5 years
 Editorial board of the Journal of Cancer Biology and Therapy (now the International Journal of Cancer)
 Member, American Association for Cancer Research
 Member, Radiation Research Society

Awards 

 Fellow of the American Society for Radiation Oncology (FASTRO) 2014
 European Society for Theapeutic Radiology and Oncology (E.S.T.R.O.) Varian Award (1990)

Selected publications

References

External links

Publications: Simon N. Powell's Publications
Pubmed: Simon N. Powell's Journal Articles
An Interview with Simon Powell

1955 births
Living people
Alumni of the University of London
People in health professions from Manchester
English emigrants to the United States
Cancer researchers